Nathaniel Woodhull Howell (January 1, 1770October 15, 1851) was a United States Representative from New York. Born in Blooming Grove, Orange County, he graduated from Princeton College in 1788. He taught school in Montgomery, New York from 1789 to 1792, studied law, was admitted to the bar and practiced in New York City and in Tioga County from 1794 to 1796, and in Canandaigua from 1796 to 1851.

Howell was attorney general for western New York from 1799 to 1802 and a member of the New York State Assembly in 1804. He was elected as a Federalist to the Thirteenth Congress, holding office from March 4, 1813 to March 3, 1815. He was appointed a member of the commission to appraise the Western Inland Lock Navigation Co. in 1817, and was the first judge of Ontario County, holding that office from 1819 to 1832. He died in Canandaiga and was buried in West Avenue Cemetery.

References

1770 births
1851 deaths
Princeton University alumni
Members of the New York State Assembly
New York (state) state court judges
Politicians from Canandaigua, New York
People from Blooming Grove, New York
Federalist Party members of the United States House of Representatives from New York (state)
People from Montgomery, New York
Woodhull family